Halkbank Ankara is a professional men's volleyball team based in Ankara, Turkey and sponsored by the state-owned Halkbank. It was founded on 21 July 1983 as Halkbank Spor Kulübü with blue, white and red colors. Halkbank Ankara plays in the Turkish Men's Volleyball League and in the CEV Champions League.

Team Roster

2016/2017

See also
Halkbank
Turkey men's national volleyball team

References

External links
 Official website 

Volleyball clubs established in 1983
1983 establishments in Turkey